Actina is a genus of flies in the family Stratiomyidae.

Species
Actina acutula Yang & Nagatomi, 1992
Actina amoena (Enderlein, 1921)
Actina apicalis (Frey, 1960)
Actina apiciflava Li, Zhang & Yang, 2009
Actina basalis Li, Li & Yang, 2011
Actina bilobata Li, Zhang & Yang, 2009
Actina bimaculata Yu, Cui & Yang, 2009
Actina chalybea Meigen, 1804
Actina compta (Enderlein, 1921)
Actina curvata Qi, Zhang & Yang, 2011
Actina diadema Lindner, 1936
Actina dulongjiangana Li, Cui & Yang, 2009
Actina elongata Li, Zhang & Yang, 2009
Actina fanjingshana Li, Zhang & Yang, 2009
Actina flavicornis (James, 1939)
Actina fraterna (Frey, 1960)
Actina gongshana Li, Li & Yang, 2011
Actina jezoensis (Matsumura, 1916)
Actina longa Li, Li & Yang, 2011
Actina maculipennis Yang & Nagatomi, 1992
Actina nitens ssp. soldatowi Pleske, 1928
Actina quadrimaculata Li, Zhang & Yang, 2011
Actina spatulata Yang & Nagatomi, 1992
Actina tengchongana Li, Li & Yang, 2011
Actina trimaculata Yu, Cui & Yang, 2009
Actina unimaculata Yu, Cui & Yang, 2009
Actina varipes Lindner, 1940
Actina viridis (Say, 1824)
Actina xizangensis Yang & Nagatomi, 1992
Actina yeni Li, Zhang & Yang, 2011
Actina zhangae Li, Li & Yang, 2011

References

Stratiomyidae
Brachycera genera
Taxa named by Johann Wilhelm Meigen
Diptera of North America
Diptera of Europe
Diptera of Asia